A kard is a kind of Mughal sword.

Kard may also refer to:
Kard, Armenia
Kard-e Bala
Kard-e Pain
Kard (group), South Korean pop group
KARD (TV), a television station
The KRISS KARD, a prototype pistol